Fenton is a city in Kossuth County, Iowa, United States. The population was 271 at the time of the 2020 census.

History

Fenton was platted in 1899. It was named after former New York State governor and senator Reuben E. Fenton.

Geography
Fenton's longitude and latitude coordinatesin decimal form are 43.216375, -94.426509.

Demographics

2010 census
As of the census of 2010, there were 279 people, 130 households, and 76 families living in the city. The racial makeup of the city was 98.6% White, 0.7% African American, 0.4% Asian, and 0.4% from other races. Hispanic or Latino of any race were 0.4% of the population.

There were 130 households, of which 20.0% had children under the age of 18 living with them, 49.2% were married couples living together, 6.2% had a female householder with no husband present, 3.1% had a male householder with no wife present, and 41.5% were non-families. 40.0% of all households were made up of individuals, and 22.3% had someone living alone who was 65 years of age or older. The average household size was 2.15 and the average family size was 2.88.

The median age in the city was 49.6 years. 20.4% of residents were under the age of 18; 6.9% were between the ages of 18 and 24; 16.1% were from 25 to 44; 30.8% were from 45 to 64; and 25.8% were 65 years of age or older. The gender makeup of the city was 48.7% male and 51.3% female.

2000 census
As of the census of 2000, there were 317 people, 157 households, and 89 families living in the city. The racial makeup of the city was 98.11% White and 1.89% Native American.

There were 157 households, out of which 22.3% had children under the age of 18 living with them, 50.3% were married couples living together, 4.5% had a female householder with no husband present, and 42.7% were non-families. 41.4% of all households were made up of individuals, and 28.0% had someone living alone who was 65 years of age or older. The average household size was 2.02 and the average family size was 2.73.

In the city, the population was spread out, with 21.1% under the age of 18, 5.0% from 18 to 24, 25.9% from 25 to 44, 19.6% from 45 to 64, and 28.4% who were 65 years of age or older. The median age was 44 years. For every 100 females, there were 81.1 males. For every 100 females age 18 and over, there were 78.6 males.

The median income for a household in the city was $30,714, and the median income for a family was $38,571. Males had a median income of $25,000 versus $17,500 for females. The per capita income for the city was $15,154. 6.4% of the population and 5.4% of families were below the poverty line. Out of the total population, 7.4% of those under the age of 18 and 5.3% of those 65 and older were living below the poverty line.

Arts and culture
Annual events
The town is well known for its annual Sweet Corn Days held the last weekend of each July.

Education
North Union Community School District operates public schools. It was previously served by the Sentral Community School District. The Sentral district merged into North Union on July 1, 2014.

References

External links

 
City-Data Comprehensive Statistical Data and more about Robins

Cities in Iowa
Cities in Kossuth County, Iowa
1899 establishments in Iowa
Populated places established in 1899